"Shocked" is a song by Australian singer Kylie Minogue from her third studio album, Rhythm of Love (1990). Written and produced by Stock Aitken and Waterman, "Shocked" was released as the album's fourth and final single in May 1991. The song later appeared on most of Minogue's major compilations including Greatest Hits (1992), Ultimate Kylie (2004) and Step Back In Time: The Definitive Collection (2019). The DNA 7-inch mix of the song also includes a rap in the bridge by Jazzy P.

Lyrically, the song canvasses confusion and understanding of love and relationships. The song has been compared by critics to her previous single "What Do I Have to Do". "Shocked" received mostly positive reviews from critics, with many praising its catchiness. Commercially, the song was successful, peaking in the top ten in her native Australia, the United Kingdom, and several other countries.

An accompanying music video was filmed for the single, shot in London. The video features Minogue entering a mansion-style home, where she is seduced by a mysterious man. The song has been noted to have a close similarity to Minogue's previous single's video "What Do I Have to Do", which featured the same man (her then boyfriend Zane O'Donnell) in a similar atmosphere. The song has been noted as one of Minogue's best singles to date, despite limited success outside her native Australia and the United Kingdom.

Background
"Shocked" was written and produced by Mike Stock, Matt Aitken and Pete Waterman, who had written and produced almost all of Minogue's material to that point, and went on to do the same for her fourth album Let's Get To It (1991), before Minogue parted ways with them. The song was released as the fourth and final single from the Rhythm of Love album. The single version of the song was remixed by DNA and features a rap verse from rapper Jazzy P.

The single was unique in that it became Kylie's first ever, and only, PWL picture-disc single - a format which Pete Waterman decried, stating "the songs can do their own work".

Critical reception
"Shocked" received positive reviews from most music critics. Quentin Harrison from Albumism described it as "luxuriant electro-pop". Johnny Loftus from AllMusic highlighted the song as an album standout from Minogue's compilation, Greatest Hits: 87-99. Larry Flick from Billboard called it "festive" and "house-inflected", adding that the track "is so catchy that it could be the multiformat hit that Minogue has been after." Nick Levine from Digital Spy misunderstood the lyrics as he said, "On 'Shocked', is she... would she... could she be singing "I was f**ked to my very foundations?". Alan Jones from Music Week stated that it "finds the diminutive Aussie in typically nasal form, but DNA's brilliant Italo house style remix and Jazzie P's cute rapping make it one that even upfront clubs can play." Hunter Felt from PopMatters enjoyed the song, saying that, while reviewing Ultimate Kylie, that they needed "even a little funk [on tracks like "Shocked"]". Mark Frith from Smash Hits said it is "brilliant", adding that she "goes for a powerful Hi-NRG sound". He also complimented the singer's voice as "strong and insistent". Also Stylus Magazine gave it a positive review, saying that along with "Give Me Just a Little More Time" and "What Do I Have to Do", they "were great songs and suddenly Kylie was a little bit cool."

Chart performance
"Shocked" received moderate success throughout the charts. In Minogue's native Australia, the song debuted at number thirteen. The song then rose to number seven, where it eventually peaked. The song then fell out the top ten, and stayed in the charts for eleven weeks in total. In the United Kingdom, the song debuted at number ten on the UK Singles Chart. The song then ascended to number six, where it eventually peaked. It stayed in the charts for a total of seven weeks. Due to the top ten chart performance of the song in the UK, Minogue became the first artist in the history of the UK charts to have their first thirteen releases go top ten.

The song had also managed to chart within several European charts, including the top ten in countries Israel, Slovenia, Ireland, South Africa, United Kingdom and Australia.

Music video

Background

The accompanying music video for "Shocked" was shot in Paris, France as Minogue was finishing her photoshoot in Paris. The video featured Minogue in a number of disguises. According to her long-term friend William Baker, her team intended to re-create her previous video for "What Do I Have to Do" to this video. South African model Zane O'Donnell, who also appeared as Minogue's love interest in the earlier video, was invited to reprise his role for this video. After appearing in both of Minogue's videos, Minogue and O'Donnell began dating.

Minogue told Clothes Show in August 1991: "I really like [the look in the video]. It's strong and it's sexy. It's quite deliberately different from what people expect of me."

Synopsis
The video begins with Minogue and an assistant driving inside O'Donnell's Manson-esque home. Minogue steps out the car to walk inside, and she and O'Donnell see each other in the revolving doors. In some scenes, it features Minogue making out with O'Donnell in the car she arrived in.

It then shoots to Minogue singing in a pink bra with white shorts and pigtails, singing to the song. The following scene shows Minogue in a pink ostrich skirt, with a nude-torso frontal view. It then features rapper Jazzy P. rapping to her feature in the song, intercut with Minogue dancing, inset of a keyhole shape. The video concludes with O'Donnell standing, watching Minogue leave the mansion in her car.

Impact and legacy
British magazine Classic Pop ranked the song number 28 in their list of "Top 40 Stock Aitken Waterman songs" in 2021. They wrote, "It took a DNA remix armed with bustling rhythms and pounding piano stabs and a rap cameo from Jazzy P to bring the fourth and final single from Rhythm Of Love out of its shell, but Kylie's 1991 hit was very much SAW at their songwriting and production best. Sex came to the forefront for the What Do I Have To Do video that preceded it, and Kylie continued in that steamy, seductive vein for Shocked, with snogging, brassieres and even a spot of keyhole voyeurism no doubt helping her to her 13th successive Top 10 UK single."

Track listings
 Australian 7-inch and cassette single, UK 12-inch and cassette single
 "Shocked" (DNA Remix)
 "Shocked" (Harding/Curnow Remix)

 UK CD single
 "Shocked" (DNA 7-inch mix) – 3:10
 "Shocked" (DNA 12-inch mix) – 6:20
 "Shocked" (Harding/Curnow 12-inch mix) – 7:30

 Digital download
 "Shocked" (DNA 7-inch mix) – 3:08
 "Shocked" (DNA 12-inch mix) – 6:14
 "Shocked" (DNA original 7-inch mix) – 4:11
 "Shocked" (DNA backing track) – 3:08
 "One Boy Girl" (12-inch mix) – 4:55
 "One Boy Girl" (instrumental) – 4:32
 "One Boy Girl" (backing track) – 4:32
 "Always Find the Time" (instrumental) – 3:35
 "Always Find the Time" (backing track) – 3:35

Charts

Weekly charts

Year-end chart

References

1990 songs
1991 singles
Kylie Minogue songs
Mushroom Records singles
Pete Waterman Entertainment singles
Song recordings produced by Stock Aitken Waterman
Songs written by Matt Aitken
Songs written by Mike Stock (musician)
Songs written by Pete Waterman